Kmicic is a Polish noble patronymic surname literally meaning "descendant of Kmita". A variant of the surname is Kmitycz.

The Kmicic family, of the  II coat of arms, came from Orsza and was of no particular note.

Notable people with the surname include:
Andrzej Kmicic, fictional character created by Henryk Sienkiewicz featured in the novel The Deluge
Samuel Kmicic, a nobleman from Grand Duchy of Lithuania in the Polish-Lithuanian Commonwealth

See also

References

Polish-language surnames
Patronymic surnames